The 1905 Butler Christians football team represented Butler University as an independent during the 1905 college football season. Led by Edgar Wingard in his second and final season as head coach, the Christians compiled a record of 7–2–1.

Schedule

References

Butler
Butler Bulldogs football seasons
Butler Christians football